Slim Khalbous is a Tunisian politician. He serves as the Tunisian Minister of Higher Education and, since 1 May 2017, National Education.

References

Living people
Government ministers of Tunisia
Year of birth missing (living people)
Carthage High Commercial Studies Institute alumni